A Tabuik is the local manifestation of the Remembrance of Muharram among the Minangkabau people in the coastal regions of West Sumatra, Indonesia, particularly in the city of Pariaman.

History
A "tabuik" also refers to the towering funeral biers carried around during the remembrance procession, and is similar in form to several of the indigenous cultures' totems found in the old world Western cultures.

The practice of throwing a tabuik into the sea has taken place every year in Pariaman on the 10th of Muharram since 1831. The practice was introduced to the region by the Shi'ite Muslim sepoy troops from India who were stationed—and later settled—there during the British Raj.

The events

The festival includes reenactments of the Battle of Karbala, and the playing of tassa and dhol drums. Although originally a Shi'a festival, nowadays most inhabitants of Pariaman and other southeastern Asia areas hold similar festivals which are even celebrated by non-Muslims.

The remembrance bier
The remembrance is referred to as Tabut or Tabot in Indonesian.  (Tabut is the name given in the Quran for The Ark of the Covenant.)  In preparation for the ceremony, one or more tabuiks are made from bamboo, rattan, and paper. During the week of Tabuik, activities include kite races, traditional plays, and dance expositions (such as the Tari Piring). The memorial draws a large crowd including dignitaries such as the provincial governor.  Visitors and celebrants can observe the tabuik in the morning before it is slowly taken to the beach in a procession. At noon the tabuik is thrown into the sea. Afterwards, many people go swimming creating 'memories' of the tabuik to keep.

Gallery

See also
 Minangkabau culture
 Culture of Indonesia
 Islam in Indonesia
 Shi'a Islam in Indonesia
 Hosay

References

External links
  Photos of Tabuik Festival
 Tabuik Festival: Sumatra, Indonesia
 Tabuik: www.West-Sumatra.com – Land of Paradise

Islamic festivals
Mourning of Muharram
Festivals in Indonesia
Shia Islam in Indonesia
Islamic terminology
Pariaman